Luna Moth Walk I is a 1982–1983 Cor-Ten steel sculpture by Charles Ginnever, installed on the Stanford University campus in Stanford, California, United States. The sculpture is part of Ginnever's "Luna Moth Walk" series; other steel artworks in the series include Luna Moth Walk II (1985) and Luna Moth Walk III (1982). Luna Moth Walk I is also one of three sculptures by Ginnever installed on the Stanford University campus, as of 2003.

See also
 1983 in art

References

1980s sculptures
Outdoor sculptures in California
Stanford University buildings and structures
Steel sculptures in California